In the 1975 Texas Rangers season, the Rangers finished 3rd in the American League West with a record of 79 wins and 83 losses. The team hit a major league-leading five grand slams.

Offseason 
 December 5, 1974: Don Stanhouse and Pete Mackanin were traded by the Rangers to the Montreal Expos for Willie Davis.
 January 9, 1975: Bump Wills was drafted by the Rangers in the 1st round (6th pick) of the secondary phase of the 1975 Major League Baseball Draft.

Regular season

Season standings

Record vs. opponents

Notable transactions 
 June 4, 1975: Willie Davis was traded by the Rangers to the St. Louis Cardinals for Ed Brinkman and Tommy Moore.
 June 13, 1975: Jim Bibby, Jackie Brown, Rick Waits, and $100,000 were traded by the Rangers to the Cleveland Indians for Gaylord Perry.
 June 13, 1975: Ed Brinkman was purchased from the Rangers by the New York Yankees.

Roster

Player stats

Batting

Starters by position 
Note: Pos = Position; G = Games played; AB = At bats; H = Hits; Avg. = Batting average; HR = Home runs; RBI = Runs batted in

Other batters 
Note: G = Games played; AB = At bats; H = Hits; Avg. = Batting average; HR = Home runs; RBI = Runs batted in

Pitching

Starting pitchers 
Note: G = Games pitched; IP = Innings pitched; W = Wins; L = Losses; ERA = Earned run average; SO = Strikeouts

Other pitchers 
Note: G = Games pitched; IP = Innings pitched; W = Wins; L = Losses; ERA = Earned run average; SO = Strikeouts

Relief pitchers 
Note: G = Games pitched; W = Wins; L = Losses; SV = Saves; ERA = Earned run average; SO = Strikeouts

Farm system 

LEAGUE CHAMPIONS: GCL Rangers

Notes

References

External links 
1975 Texas Rangers team page at Baseball Reference
1975 Texas Rangers team page at www.baseball-almanac.com

Texas Rangers seasons
Texas Rangers season
Texas Rang